The International Institute of Agriculture (IIA) was founded in Rome in 1905 by the King of Italy Victor Emmanuel III with the intent of creating a clearinghouse for collection of agricultural statistics. It was created primarily due to the efforts of David Lubin.  In 1930, the IIA published the first world agricultural census.  After World War II, both its assets and mandate were handed over to the Food and Agriculture Organization (FAO) of the United Nations.

History
In 1904 the idea of such an institute came to David Lubin of Sacramento, California, and his project found favor with the king of Italy. The latter gave a building in Rome and an annual income of $60,000. The king called the first congress in 1906, and delegates attended from 40 countries. At the congress, a treaty was formed making the institute a permanent organization and defining its scope and activities.

Government
The government of the IIA was vested in the general assembly of delegates from affiliated countries, meeting every two years, and in a permanent executive committee, on which there was one representative from each country. This permanent committee had direct charge of the IIA. The general officers were the president (also chairman of the permanent committee), the vice president and the secretary general.

The work of the institute was divided among four bureaus:

Bureau of the secretary general had charge of the personnel, financial and other routine business, the building and its equipment, the printing and distribution of publications, the library and general bibliographical work, and, as a more recent service, the preparation and publication of an annual compilation of agricultural legislation in the different countries of the world.
Bureau of general statistics collected, collated and published statistics of production and commerce in agricultural products, both animal and vegetable, throughout the world.
Bureau of agricultural intelligence and plant diseases collected and published information regarding the progress of scientific and experimental investigations and practical experience in agriculture throughout the world and, as a branch of this work, gives special attention to the diseases of plants and to entomology.
Bureau of economic and social institutions collected and published statistics and general information regarding agricultural co-operation, insurance and credit, together with other matters relating to the economic and social organization of rural communities.

The annual budget of the institute was $250,000 (c. 1915), contributed by the adhering governments on the basis of a number of units assigned to each country.

Publications
Those publications of the IIA which had a bearing on the formation of the price of the staples (such as crop reports and data on exports, imports and stocks) were based exclusively on official information, supplied direct to the institute by the adhering governments. Other publications were produced from (a) information officially communicated by the governments, (b) original articles contributed by eminent authorities designated by the adhering governments, (c) excerpts and abstracts of articles translated from the 2,225 official and unofficial periodical publications of the world received by the IIA.

The IIA printed and published two annuals and three monthly and one weekly bulletins, together with a considerable number of monographs on special subjects. The annuals dealt with agricultural statistics and legislation, respectively. The monthly bulletins were on (a) agricultural statistics (b) agricultural intelligence and diseases of plants, and (c) economic and social institutions, and the weekly bulletin is bibliographical. The monthly bulletins were published in French, German, English, Spanish, Italian and Hungarian. French being the official language of the IIA, the editions in that language were paid for from the funds of the Institute.

Provision for the edition in the other languages was made by the countries interested. The Congress of the United States made an annual appropriation of $5,000 (c. 1915) for translating and printing the English edition, the rest of the expense being borne by Great Britain and her colonies.

Library
The IIA collected a great library of agricultural literature. As the IIA became more firmly established and its value as an international clearing house on economic information was more generally recognized, it was met with a constantly increasing demand for the extension of its service along many lines.
After the IIA ceased operations in 1945, its library collection was transferred to David Lubin Memorial Library (DLML) of the FAO. The DLML is open to external visitors.  Procedures for library visitors can be found here.

See also
David Lubin
Food and Agriculture Organization

References

Agricultural organisations based in Italy
Food science institutes
Food and Agriculture Organization